Molo may refer to:

People
 Molo (ethnic group)
 Molo of Rhodes, rhetorical teacher of Cicero and Julius Caesar
 Molo (satrap of Media) (died 220 BC), a general and satrap of the Seleucid king Antiochus the Great 
 Molo (footballer) (born 1985), real name, Manuel Jesús Casas García, Spanish footballer known as Molo
 Francis Molo (born 1994), New Zealand-Australian Rugby League player

Places
 Molo (monument), an historic quayside in Venice, Italy
 Molo (Genoa), a neighbourhood in the old town of Genoa
 Molo, Iloilo City, a district in Iloilo City, Philippines
 Molo, Kenya

Other
 Molo (group), shortened name of Molotov Movement, a hip hop / rap collective in Denmark
 Molo (kids fashion), a Danish kids fashion brand 
 OS X Mountain Lion or MoLo
 Mobile local search or MoLo
 Molo (butterfly), a genus of butterflies in the grass skipper family
 molo (design company), a Canadian multidisciplinary design studio
 molo, an African lute

See also
 Mollo (disambiguation)
 Pancit Molo, a Filipino pork dumpling soup